In 1946, Bill Veeck finally became the owner of a major league team, the Cleveland Indians. He immediately put the team's games on radio, and set about to put his own indelible stamp on the franchise. Actor Bob Hope also acquired a minority share of the Indians.

Offseason
 Prior to 1946 season: Al Aber was signed as an amateur free agent by the Indians.

Regular season 
During the season, Bob Feller became the last pitcher to win at least 25 games in one season for the Indians in the 20th century.

Season standings

Record vs. opponents

Notable transactions 
 June 26, 1946: Mickey Rocco and cash were traded by the Indians to the Chicago Cubs for Heinz Becker.
 July 4, 1946: The Indians traded a player to be named later to the Chicago White Sox for Tom Jordan. The Indians completed the deal by sending Frankie Hayes to the White Sox on July 15.

Roster

Player stats

Batting

Starters by position 
Note: Pos = Position; G = Games played; AB = At bats; H = Hits; Avg. = Batting average; HR = Home runs; RBI = Runs batted in

Other batters 
Note: G = Games played; AB = At bats; H = Hits; Avg. = Batting average; HR = Home runs; RBI = Runs batted in

Pitching

Starting pitchers 
Note: G = Games pitched; IP = Innings pitched; W = Wins; L = Losses; ERA = Earned run average; SO = Strikeouts

Other pitchers 
Note: G = Games pitched; IP = Innings pitched; W = Wins; L = Losses; ERA = Earned run average; SO = Strikeouts

Relief pitchers 
Note: G = Games pitched; W = Wins; L = Losses; SV = Saves; ERA = Earned run average; SO = Strikeouts

Awards and honors 
Bob Feller, Led American League with 36 complete games (it would also be the highest total in the decade)
All-Star Game

Bob Feller, Pitcher (starter)

Frankie Hayes, Catcher (starter)

Ken Keltner, Third baseman (starter)

Farm system 

LEAGUE CHAMPIONS: Harrisburg, Centreville, Batavia

Notes

References 
1946 Cleveland Indians at Baseball Reference
1946 Cleveland Indians  at Baseball Almanac

Cleveland Indians seasons
Cleveland Indians season
Cleveland Indians